The Auckland Warriors 1996 season was the Auckland Warriors 2nd season in first-grade. The club competed in Australasia's Australian Rugby League competition. The coach of the team was John Monie while Greg Alexander was the club's captain.

Milestones
29 July - Round 18 - Gene Ngamu scores 28 points (3 tries, 8 goals) in the defeat of the North Queensland Cowboys, setting the club's point scoring record.

Jersey & Sponsors

Super League

As the Auckland Warriors had, along with seven other clubs, signed with News Limited they did not originally intend to compete in the Australian Rugby League's Optus Cup in 1996. Instead Super League was scheduled to start on 1 March 1996.

Legal proceedings had been ongoing between the ARL and News Ltd since 1995 and on 23 February 1996 Justice James Burchett ruled the new Super League competition to be illegal. As a result, the eight Super League clubs were obliged to compete in the Optus Cup in 1996. However the competition, which was originally planned to kick off on 1 March was delayed and commenced on 22 March.

As a result of the court action the Warriors were not invited to participate in the ARL's 1996 Rugby League World Sevens but many of their players instead took part in Super League's 1996 World Nines, which were won by New Zealand.

All Super League clubs apart from the Warriors forfeited Round One of the Optus Cup. The Warriors board instead directed reserve grade coach Frank Endacott to organise two teams of un-affiliated players to fly to Brisbane. Endacott did so, assembling teams largely made up of the Otahuhu Leopards and Ellerslie Eagles senior sides, and the Warriors first and reserve grade sides were awarded a win each via forfeit as Brisbane refused to play.

Auckland Warriors players were again ineligible for the New South Wales and Queensland State of Origin sides and the Australian Kangaroos due to the Warriors Super League stance.

In October 1996 New Limited won an appeal and Super League was allowed to go ahead in 1997.

Fixtures 

The Warriors used Ericsson Stadium as their home ground in 1996, their only home ground since they entered the competition in 1995.

Trial Matches

Regular season

*Brisbane forfeited Round One. The Warriors had sent a team to Brisbane consisting of players un-signed to Super League.

Ladder

Squad 

The Warriors used twenty eight players in 1996, including nine who made their first grade debuts.

Staff
Chairman: Peter McLeod
Chief Executive Officer: Ian Robson
Football Manager: Laurie Stubbing

Coaching Staff
Head Coach: John Monie
Reserve Grade Coach: Frank Endacott
Development Officer: John Ackland

Transfers

Gains

Losses

Other Teams
The Warriors participated in the ARL's Reserve grade competition that mirrored the senior draw. The Reserve grade side again made the finals, finishing third. Unlike in 1995, the Warriors did not field a Colts side in the Lion Red Cup.

In the Club Championship the Warriors finished fifth overall.

In the Reserve Grade Finals the Warriors first bet Sydney City 19–18 in the Quarterfinals. In the Semifinals they defeated Brisbane 18-12 to make the Grand Final. However, in the Grand Final the Warriors went down 14-12 to the Cronulla Sharks, the second year in a row that a Warriors team had lost a Grand Final. The cost of the finals campaign to the club was estimated at between $70,000 and $75,000.

Awards
Stephen Kearney won the club's Player of the Year award.

References

External links
Warriors official site
1996 Warriors Season rugbyleagueproject.org

New Zealand Warriors seasons
Auckland Warriors season
War